Albert or Bert Anderson may refer to:

 Albert Anderson (cricketer) (1889–1944), Irish cricketer
 Albert Anderson (politician) (1907–1981), Northern Irish politician
 Albert R. Anderson (1837–1898), U.S. Representative from Iowa
Albert E. Anderson, member of the Maine House of Representatives
 Albert Anderson (19th century), the landowner who founded Horse Cave, Kentucky
 Albert B. Anderson (1857–1938), U.S. federal judge 
 Al Anderson (musician) (born 1950), full name Albert Anderson
 Albert Anderson (Montana judge) (1876–1948), justices of the Montana Supreme Court
 Albert Anderson (rugby union) (born 1961), New Zealand rugby union player
 Bert Anderson (politician), American politician in the North Dakota House of Representatives

See also
Albert Andersson (disambiguation)
Al Anderson (disambiguation)